Mikhaēl II may refer to:

 Michael II, Byzantine Emperor (died in 829)
 Patriarch Michael II of Constantinople (ruled 1143–1146)
 Michael II Komnenos Doukas (died in 1266/68)